The Pitch may refer to:

 "The Pitch" (Seinfeld)
 The Pitch (TV series), an AMC original series
 The Pitch (podcast), an American podcast
 The Pitch (newspaper), a newspaper in Kansas City
 A segment in The Gruen Transfer, an Australian television show

See also 
 Pitch (disambiguation)